Marco Antônio Paes dos Santos (20 August 1963) is a former Brazilian football player.

Playing career
He was a defender for Sport Club do Recife winning the Campeonato Brasileiro 1987, and author of the goal in the victory over Guarani by 1 x 0 in Ilha do Retiro, making him one of the biggest idols of the club's history.

He joined Japanese J1 League club Shimizu S-Pulse in 1992. He played all matches in 1992 J.League Cup and S-Pulse won the 2nd place. He played many matches in 1993 season too. S-Pulse won the 3rd place in 1993 J.League and the 2nd place in 1993 J.League Cup for 2 years in a row. He left the club end of 1993 season.

Japan statistics

References
geocities

External links

1963 births
Living people
Brazilian footballers
Brazilian expatriate footballers
Expatriate footballers in Japan
J1 League players
Shimizu S-Pulse players
Association football defenders